Prasanthi Nilayam (800 meters (2624 feet) above sea level) is the main ashram of Sathya Sai Baba located in the town  of Puttaparthi in, Sri Sathya Sai district Andhra Pradesh, India. Sathya Sai Baba was born in Puttaparthi. "Prasanthi Nilayam" means literally "Abode of the Highest Peace." Sathya Sai Baba gave daily darshan to his devotees in this ashram. Sathya Sai Baba was usually present in Prasanthi Nilayam from early June to the middle of March.

History
At the age of seventeen, Sathya Sai Baba told one devotee, "The Sai Pravesh (the advent of Sai) will transform that region into Prasanti Pradesh (a region of highest peace). There will rise a bhavan (mansion)! Lakhs of people from all over India, why only India, from all over the world, will come and wait there for Sai darshan!"

In 1944 a mandir was built to facilitate the growing number of Sai Baba devotees. It is now commonly referred to as the "old mandir." Prasanti Nilayam was inaugurated on 23 November 1950, the 24th birthday of Sathya Sai Baba and its construction lasted about two years "Sathya Sai Baba can be said to be the architect and engineer who directed the entire work for construction", says Narayana Kasturi. Sathya Sai Baba supervised the construction, acquiring of equipment, and watched over the devotees who constructed the ashram." Heavy girders for the central prayer hall was transported from Tiruchirappalli by train to Penukonda and then had to be brought over the district road, sixteen miles long." The mandir was painted blue, yellow, and pink "communicating the message of the harmony of spirit, intellect, and heart respectively; for blue stands for spirit, yellow for intellect, and pink for heart (love). The rich harmony of the three does result in Santi (peace) and Prasanti (supreme peace); and that really is the message of the Prasanti Mandir." In October 1957 a hospital was inaugurated on the hill behind the ashram."

Poornachandra Auditorium was built in 1973 where cultural programmes, conferences and yagnas during Dasara take place." It can seat around 15,000 people in the 60 x 40-metre area. Sathya Sai Baba's living quarters are upstairs above the stage."

The Sarva Dharma Stupa, a 50 ft high pillar celebrating the unity of all religions, was built in November 1975 to mark the advent of the Avatar." Sai Kulwant Hall with a seating capacity of about 20,000 is where daily darshan took place. Sai Kulwant Hall is between Sathya Sai Baba's residence (Yajur Mandir) and the Prasanti Mandir. The carved icons of Rama, Sita, Lakshmana, and Hanuman were installed by Sathya Sai Baba on 30 September 1999.

The Prasanti Nilayam ashram hosts many mandirs including a Ganesha Mandir, Subramanya Mandir, Gayatri Mandir, a meditation tree planted by Sai Baba in 1950, an eternal heritage museum, Chaitanya Jyoti museum), multiple canteens, cricket ground, indoor sports stadium, super specialty hospital, educational institutions, shopping complex, administration buildings, devotee quarters, accommodation rooms and halls. There is a branch office of the State Bank of India in Prasanti Nilayam."

Climate
The climate is generally hot and dry throughout the year, summer temperatures ranging from 30 °C-40 °C, (86F - 104F) and winter 20 °C-27 °C (68F - 81F).

Transport

Road
Puttaparthi is well connected by road to all parts of Anantapur district, the district headquarters Anantapur, the state capital Hyderabad, Bangalore and Chennai, by state-run APSRTC buses. KSRTC buses also ply from Bangalore.

Rail

Puttaparthi has a railway station named as Sri Sathya Sai Prasanthi Nilayam which started functioning from 23 November 2000, which was Baba's 74th birth anniversary. This station falls under the Bangalore Division of the South Western Railway and lies on the Bangalore-Guntakal railway line. It is easy to reach the town from the railway station in 20-25 mins, through various modes of transport like cabs, autorickshaws and APSRTC buses. The town is connected directly by train to Bangalore, Chennai, Hyderabad, Coimbatore, Mumbai, New Delhi, Bhubaneswar and Kolkata.

Air

See also
 Puttaparthi
 Sathya Sai Baba
 Sri Sathya Sai University

References

External links

 Prasanthi Nilayam
 Sri Sathya Sai Books & Publications Trust, Prasanthi Nilayam
 Radio Sai Global Harmony, the digital radio channel of Prasanthi Nilayam

Sathya Sai Baba
Ashrams
1944 establishments in India
Tourist attractions in Andhra Pradesh
Puttaparthi
Buildings and structures in Anantapur district